Hirn is a German language habitational surname. Notable people with the name include:

 Akseli Hirn (1845–1906), Finnish minister
 Gustave-Adolphe Hirn (1815–1890), French physicist, astronomer. mathematician and engineer 
 Karl Engelbrecht Hirn (1872–1907), Finnish botanist, specialized in freshwater algae

References 

German-language surnames
German toponymic surnames